The Chromatica Ball was the sixth headlining concert tour by American singer Lady Gaga in support of her sixth studio album, Chromatica (2020). Comprising 20 shows, it began on July 17, 2022, in Düsseldorf and concluded on September 17, 2022, in Miami Gardens. Initially conceived as a six-date-long, limited tour, new dates were added after it was delayed by two years due to the COVID-19 pandemic.

It is Gaga's first all-stadium concert tour and features a stage inspired by brutalist architecture. In line with the promoted album's themes, the show's narrative depicts a journey around trauma and healing. It is divided into distinct segments, each separated by a video introduction and a costume change. Gaga opted for a "darker, edgier" appearance for the tour in contrast to the pink cyberpunk look from Chromatica earlier promotional imagery; her wardrobe included outfits by designers she frequently worked with in the past, such as Alexander McQueen, Gareth Pugh, and her sister, Natali Germanotta.

The tour received critical acclaim, with various outlets rating it with the highest score in their respective reviews. Critics praised the visuals, the choreography, Gaga's vocal skills, and many of them singled out the piano segment as the concert's strongest part. On numerous American dates, Gaga interpolated political statements to her piano performances, addressing topics such as gun violence and abortion rights. According to Billboard Boxscore, The Chromatica Ball ultimately grossed $112.4 million from 834,000 tickets sold, breaking multiple personal attendance records and venue records.

Background and development 

The tour was originally announced via Gaga's social media on March 5, 2020, as a six-date-long, limited concert series for the summer of that year, in support of her sixth studio album, Chromatica (2020). The announcement was accompanied by a dual-sided graphic, one side an extreme closeup of Gaga's face, sporting the 'Chromatica symbol' on her cheek, mostly covered with a long, straightened, pink wig. The other side of the graphic featured the tour's limited itinerary surrounded by imagery from the music video and promotional campaign for "Stupid Love", the lead single from Chromatica. When announced, the tour was set to be the singer's first all-stadium tour, with every date scheduled for a multi-purpose stadium, such as MetLife Stadium. Due to safety concerns over the COVID-19 pandemic, it was first postponed to summer 2021, before its second postponement to summer 2022.

New dates with additional venues in Europe and North America were scheduled and officially announced on March 7, 2022, making the once limited tour a 15-date engagement advertised as "The Chromatica Ball Summer Stadium Tour". On April 14, 2022, two dates in Tokorozawa were announced, marking the singer's first concerts in Japan in eight years. To commemorate the event, a Japanese tour edition of Chromatica with extra content was released on August 31, 2022, and a pop-up shop selling merchandise items opened on the same day. Three additional North American shows in Hershey, Houston, and Miami Gardens were added later on May 16, bringing the tour's total number of shows to 20.

During Gaga's last tour, the Joanne World Tour (2017–2018), the singer was forced to cancel the majority of the European leg of the concert series, due to severe pain caused by fibromyalgia. Shortly before The Chromatica Ball began, Gaga admitted that there "was a time I thought I’d never be on stage again", while adding that she feels "more pain-free than I have in ages." Rolling Stone Hannah Ewens noted that the concert series was "carefully and successfully designed with Gaga's illness in mind", with fewer dates than any of her previous world tours, and the more complex choreography reserved for the latter section of the show.

Production

Conception and stage setup 

The show is built on a narrative which depicts a journey around trauma and healing, similarly to the promoted Chromatica album. On the day of the first tour date, Gaga posted a video on her Instagram account, giving an explanation behind the show: "The stage was inspired by brutalist architecture, materials, textures, crudity, transparency. A real savage and hard look at yourself, what you've been through. I wanted to tell a story with abstraction and art, so the show celebrates things that I have always loved like art and fashion and dance and music and technology, poetry, and the way all of those things work together." She also added that the show "documents the many different stages and sides of grief and the manic energy of grief" that she endured throughout her life.

The "imposing" stage set prompted media comparisons to a nightclub or S&M club in Germany. For The Telegraph Neil McCormick, the black and white brutalist architecture invoked a "nightmarish Soviet dystopia as imagined by Fritz Lang", an opinion shared by Billboard Joe Lynch, who found shades of Lang's 1927 expressionist film, Metropolis in the design. McCormick felt that "this initially bleak aesthetic" provided a striking contrast to the colorful costume changes and special effects. The main stage was accompanied by two catwalks, and five five-story high screens. A secondary, smaller stage houses Gaga's piano. Bedecked in tree branches, the instrument received comparisons to H. R. Giger's work. In addition to flamethrowers which provided pyrotechnic effects, the audience received LED wristbands which were glowing in time with the beat and changed color for each song.

Costume design 
Nicola Formichetti served as fashion director of the show, who worked with stylists Sandra Amador and Tom Erebout in selecting the costumes for the tour. Throughout the show, Gaga wears outfits by Gareth Pugh, Alexander McQueen, Christian Lacroix, Aziz Rebar, Vex Latex, Dead Lotus Couture, and her sister Natali Germanotta's fashion brand, Topo Studio NY. Christian Allaire of Vogue noted Gaga omitted her pink cyberpunk look from the music video of "Stupid Love", and instead "reviving her signature 'Mother Monster' style, which favors a darker, edgier aesthetic". She called The Chromatica Ball "a glorious return to freaky-deaky dressing", and compared her outfits to those from The Monster Ball Tour (2009–2011) and the Born This Way Ball (2012–2013) concert tours, which were "ominously sci-fi (but high-fashion)."

Gaga's hard-structured sarcophagus costume in the opening sequence was inspired by David Bowie's 1979 Saturday Night Live performance. The outfit is "like a concrete sphynx, it opens down the middle to reveal mirrored interiors." A later part of the show sees Gaga showcasing various golden looks. First she puts on a metallic gold moiré outfit by Alexander McQueen: her suit includes a cropped jacket with shoulder pads and a large lapel, and wide-legged trousers; removing the jacket, she shows off a sleeveless button-down collared shirt. Matching gold boots complete the monochrome look. Gaga then puts on a claw-like gold headpiece by Philip Treacy, along with a gold gown designed by her sister. For Daniel Rodgers of Dazed, the outfit hearkened back to Andrew Lloyd Webber's Joseph and The Amazing Technicolour Dreamcoat. Another McQueen outfit for a heavily choreographed part of the show was a crystal-embellished latex bodysuit and leather biker jacket, along with leather biker boots worn over black fishnet stockings.

Gaga also wore a blood-red gown with peak-shoulders, along with black leather boots and fingerless gloves. Removing the garment revealed a nude latex bodysuit splattered in red, blood-like goo, with taped X's over Gaga's nipples, along with a big, spiked necklace. This was later complimented with a sparkly red cropped puffer jacket and oversized sunglasses. A different latex outift consists of a BDSM-inspired corset with harness-like buckles and horned shoulders, along with loose-legged leather pants and a policewoman cap. Lauren O'Neill from i thought this "authoritarian" look recalled Gaga's music video for "Alejandro" (2010), while The Philadelphia Inquirer Dan Deluca found it to be "an homage to 'Justify My Love'-era Madonna". During the piano ballad section of the concert, Gaga appears in a purple-and-black bodysuit and headpiece, described by journalists as "a very glamorous bug" and "a purple praying mantis". The headpiece further received comparisons to a prop from Star Wars Mos Eisley cantina or The Fifth Element Diva Plavalaguna character. Gaga's final look consists of a black-and-white bodysuit and leather biker jacket, along with fishnet tights, knee-high boots, and a bone-shaped handpiece.

Concert synopsis 

The show was approximately 130-minutes long, divided into a prelude, four acts and a finale, each one accompanied by an interlude directed by Gaga's longtime collaborator Nick Knight. It follows a loose narrative of Gaga's journey from being trapped to becoming liberated. In an intro video, Gaga appears in a liquid-metal ballgown, and then as shadow-figure with four legs, wearing bulbous heels and a tall crown. The show's prelude sees the singer reflecting on her career by performing her three earliest tracks from The Fame and The Fame Monster. It starts with the dancers doing a routine dancing to the synthesized arrangement of Bach's "Fugue No. 24", which leads into "Bad Romance", similarly to the song's music video. Gaga appears atop a set piece reminiscent of a giant slab of concrete singing the track, while standing still inside a leather sarcophagus-type garment with only her face visible . Layers of her outfit are slowly removed as she spins around with limited motions for "Just Dance" and "Poker Face". The first act opens with an interlude which shows a brutalist hospital. Gaga then returns on stage seemingly covered in blood, and continues with three songs which share a common lyrical theme: the singer expressing her fears and internal struggles. She is lying on an operating table elevated in the air for "Alice". During "Replay", she is carried by one of her dancers, before the full choreography commences and Gaga screamingly commands the audience, "Put your paws up!" For "Monster", Gaga performs a dance routine with zombie motifs, and gets attacked and "eaten alive" by her dancers, only to re-emerge in a latex red jacket with pointy shoulder pads and jet-black sunglasses.

After an interlude commences the second act, Gaga comes back on stage dressed in a vinyl dominatrix ensemble, while frantic red lights illuminate the stage for "911". "Sour Candy" is performed with synchronized choreography and Korean letters being displayed on the screens, followed by "Telephone", which sees the set's flamethrowers put into use. The performance of "LoveGame" involves "grinding guitars", which convert the track into an amalgamation of dance-pop and heavy metal. Another video sequence showcases celestial explosions while Gaga and her dancers change into matching gold satin for the third act. Gaga asks the audience if they ever had to battle for their lives, and performs "Babylon", voguing together with her dancers. She dedicates the song to Alexander McQueen. Gaga then puts on a face-covering hat and slowly walks through the audience in a pathway between her main stage and the smaller, second stage, while singing "Free Woman". She reminds her audience, "this is a ball, and everyone's welcome here", as she sits down to her piano which is set inside a sculpture of thorns. After proclaiming that she sees plenty of people in the audience who know exactly who they are, she performs her self-acceptance anthem "Born This Way", initially in a stripped back rendition, before switching to the song's uptempo and choreographed version.

Another visual showcases Gaga dressed in wedding gowns, covered in flowers and jewels. She then returns to the piano for the fourth act in an insect outfit to perform two songs from A Star Is Born, "Shallow" and "Always Remember Us This Way". During "The Edge of Glory", Gaga briefly stops for a speech in which she salutes the audience for their bravery during the pandemic. She talks about the sorrowful state which inspired her to write "1000 Doves" and expresses regret for concealing her pain with a joyful pop track before playing it in on the piano, the way she originally intended. Gaga stands on the piano bench while leaning forward to reach the keys during "Fun Tonight". She dedicates the song to anyone who are out with their friends, but not having fun inside. Gaga receives a microphone stand for "Enigma", and spins the stand above her head during the performance. In the last video interlude, Gaga recites a sonnet that talks about art and the responsibility of the artist. For the celebratory finale, she performs "Stupid Love" and "Rain on Me" in a crystal-embellished bodysuit; the latter song opens and closes with Gaga lying flat on her back. She returns one last time for an encore, dressed in latex and leather, and sporting a metallic claw. Guitarists and pyrotechnic effects accompany her for the performance of Top Gun: Maverick theme song "Hold My Hand". Gaga declares her love to the audience by saying "you may not always hold my hand, but I’ll always hold yours." She raises her metallic claw and hand to form a heart. As she expresses her thankfulness for everyone coming to the show, the screen displays her claw one last time. Then, the lights go out as she walks off stage.

Critical reception

Europe 

Reviewing the show in Düsseldorf, Boris Pofalla from Welt compared it to a rock concert, because of the "hands in the air, flashing bracelets around the wrists, several guitarists with trapezoidal instruments on stage booms, twirling dancers and, very impressively, many flamethrowers." He finished stating that the first show was a "return of a performer who can rightly be called one of the greatest pop star alive and perhaps the last." Similarly, David Cobbald of The Line of Best Fit thought that "Gaga proves herself as this generation's rockstar" with the show. In a five-star review for The Telegraph, Neil McCormick commented that the concert "clearly meant as much to the artist as the audience, adding real emotional impact to an absolutely slam-bang pop spectacular. It is fantastic to have such an immense talent back where she belongs." Lauren O'Neill from i also gave the tour a five star rating. She called Gaga "one of the best performers in the world to watch live", while praising the production, the dancing, and highlighting the acoustic section of the show, saying that "there are few vocalists who do better when it's just their voice and the keys". Writing for Rolling Stone, Hannah Ewens gave the show a five-star review, praising Gaga as "one of the greatest living musical performers" and pointed out the piano section as the highlight of the night.

The Guardians Michael Cragg described the show as "high camp" and rated it 4 out of 5 stars. Giving it the maximum 5 stars, NME Nick Levine called the show "utterly brilliant" and a "thrilling, high-concept return from pop's finest". According to Adam Davidson of Clash, "the show was as predictably unpredictable as you’d expect from a Lady Gaga concert with everything from incredible choreographed dances to avant-garde theatrics and lots of special effects that made it a night to remember for all in attendance." Arwa Haider of the Financial Times rated the show with the maximum 5 stars for its "tremendous attention to detail", saying that "Gaga's designer costumes and mid-song metamorphoses were spectacular, her vocal power — soaringly soulful and screamingly punkish in turn — and slick choreography triumphant". The London Evening Standard Gemma Samways found it an "extraordinary stage show that more than matched the ambition of the album", which was "as ludicrous as it was compelling, and all the more unforgettable for it." She described the show as "a perfect marriage of visuals and sonics" and highlighted Gaga for "showcasing her truly extraordinary vocals".

North America 

Writing for Consequence, Sarah Kurchak called the concert the "can't-miss pop event of the summer", which "mixed moments of triumph, vulnerability, celebration, defiance, heartache". The show was described as a "trippy journey" and a "P. T. Barnum-on-acid spectacle", by USA Today Melissa Ruggieri and the Boston Herald Jed  Gottlieb, respectively. Billboard Joe Lynch highlighted the piano section of the show,  writing that "Gaga's vocals were fully audible and impressive from start to finish, but during this part of the show, we're treated to the depths of her substantial pipes and her deep attachment to the energy of the crowd. Similarly, Selena Fragassi of the Chicago Sun-Times complimented the piano section, saying it was "the most evocative" part of the show where "Gaga finally sat still long enough for her impeccable vocals to shine". She further praised Gaga's "authentic human connection" and the "Herculean effort of costuming, choreography, lighting and set design that will go down as one of her career best." Bob Gendron of the Chicago Tribune praised the show and called it "a performance for the ages", where "Gaga exuded bigger-than-life confidence yet repeatedly exhibited generous degrees of sincerity and humility." He also acknowledged the singer's "skilled dancers" and "versatile backing band."

Rolling Stone Brittany Spanos opined that "Gaga puts on one of the best productions in pop, but she’s just as good letting her immense voice shine." She also praised the setlist, writing that "moments when the old merged with the new were deeply satisfying". The Dallas Observer Carly May Gravley thought that "the show felt bigger than just one album and served as almost a manifesto for the singer, combining her love of music, fashion, film and theater to pull together her sprawling catalog and create a cohesive statement." According to Dan Deluca of The Philadelphia Inquirer, "the show was fast-paced, satisfyingly punchy, expertly staged and action packed, but still lost momentum at times", due to the five-act structure which divided the show with video interludes. Likewise, Variety Chris Willman noted the "element of the momentum going into stall mode" during the costume-changes, but praised the show's piano segment and Gaga's "dance-teria mode", as well. Mikael Wood of the Los Angeles Times called Gaga "a live singer through and through", and opined that with her show, she — more than most other performers in pop music — is "committed to exposing" the cracks "in the armor of a superstar’s self-mythologizing."

Asia 
Writing for Yomiuri Shimbun after the concerts in Japan, Yusuke Tsuruta noted Gaga's "lively" presence and "eccentric costumes [which] are synonymous" with her, and added that thanks to her confident singing voice, the stripped-down, piano part of the show managed to captivate the audience just as much as her choreographed, high-energy performances.

Commercial performance 
On June 16, 2022, Billboard reported that the tour had surpassed $80 million in early ticket sales across its 20 shows. According to Arthur Fogel, the CEO of Live Nation's Global Touring Division, the shows in London, Paris, Boston, Tokyo, Toronto, Chicago, and Düsseldorf were sold out with over a month left until the tour's kickoff in July. Fogel spoke very highly of the commercial response to the tour's dates on sale, adding his only source of disappointment is "that we don't have more time to add more shows." He cited that Gaga's schedule, which includes her Las Vegas residency, Enigma + Jazz & Piano, simply did not allow time for more tour dates to be scheduled.

Eventually earning $112.4 million from 834,000 tickets sold, throughout the tour's run, Gaga broke multiple personal attendance records and venue records. During her concert at the Stade de France on July 24, Gaga performed in front of 78,000 people, making this date the largest crowd of her career. She has the all-time top gross at Oracle Park ($7.4 million) and gross and attendance at Wrigley Field ($6.9 million; 43,019). On August 19, the singer broke the record for the highest attendance for a single concert at Fenway Park in Boston, performing to 37,200 people. The show also broke the record for the highest-grossing concert ever at the same venue, with over $5.7 million in ticket sales. The show at Hersheypark Stadium on August 28 grossed over $4 million, selling over 30,000 tickets, making it the highest grossing show ever at that venue, a record previously held by The Rolling Stones since 2005.

It was reported by Billboard that The Chromatica Ball earned $28.3 million from six shows in July in Europe, $72.6 million in July, August, and September during the North American leg, and $11.5 million from two shows in Japan. For all US shows, $1 from each ticket sold was donated to Born This Way Foundation. Gaga maximized her average audience, with 41,700 tickets per night, up 127% from her previous best of 18,400 on The Born This Way Ball. In average revenue, the tour was up 190% to a pace of $5.6 million, passing the Joanne World Tour's $1.9 million. With twenty shows, it became her highest-grossing tour in a decade, and marked the third $100 million-grossing tour of her career, following The Monster Ball and The Born This Way Ball.

Political commentary 
On select dates in North America and Japan, Gaga added "Angel Down" to the setlist (from her 2016 album, Joanne), a track which was inspired by the death of Trayvon Martin, and further described by the singer as a song about America. Before performing the song, she addressed different topics which are under debate in the United States. On most dates, she talked about fighting for reproductive rights, after the overturning of Roe v. Wade removed the constitutional right to abortion. In Philadelphia, she opened the song by saying: "This is for everyone who has to worry about their body. I know you came to the concert to have fun. But some people will die during childbirth, and some people will get raped, and they can’t have those kids." In Atlanta, she dedicated the song "to the safety of all people in Georgia", and addressed "anybody that can bear children". Her performance in Texas came three months after the Robb Elementary School shooting. She dedicated the song to victims of gun violence, "as a prayer to keep the people safe so we don't have to see any angels down". Here Gaga also acknowledged Texas's status as a swing state, and expressed her hope that that even though the state has a "purple, purple heart", it will go into the Democratic direction. She added: "Maybe I brought this up and you're thinking, 'This is not for me, I do not want to talk about this right now,' and you may not agree but guess what? I don't know that this is about what you believe. This is about keeping people safe so sometimes we have to put aside what we believe."

In Washington D.C., Gaga dedicated "The Edge of Glory" to "every woman who now has to worry about her body if she gets pregnant", and added that she prays "that this country will speak up. That we will stick together and not stop until it’s right." Earlier in the D.C. show, before performing "Born This Way", she also addressed same-sex marriage, and said: "They better not try to mess with gay marriage in this country!"

Set list 
This set list is from the July 21, 2022, concert in Stockholm. It is not intended to represent all concerts for the tour.

 "Bad Romance" 
 "Just Dance"
 "Poker Face"
 "Alice" 
 "Replay"
 "Monster"
 "911" 
 "Sour Candy"
 "Telephone"
 "LoveGame" 
 "Babylon" 
 "Free Woman"
 "Born This Way"
 "Shallow"
 "Always Remember Us This Way"
 "The Edge of Glory"
 "1000 Doves"
 "Fun Tonight"
 "Enigma"
 "Stupid Love"
 "Rain on Me"
Encore
 "Hold My Hand"

Shows

Notes

References

External links 

 The Chromatica Ball on Lady Gaga Official Website

2022 concert tours
Lady Gaga concert tours
Concert tours postponed due to the COVID-19 pandemic
Concert tours of Europe
Concert tours of North America
Concert tours of Germany
Concert tours of Sweden
Concert tours of France
Concert tours of the Netherlands
Concert tours of the United Kingdom
Concert tours of Canada
Concert tours of the United States
Concert tours of Japan